The transfers for the Portuguese Liga for the 2009–10 season began after the 2008–09 season finished on 1 July 2009 and closed at midnight on 1 September 2009. The transfer window then reopened during January 2010.

Summer 2009
1/7/2009  Patric —  São Caetano → Benfica — €3 million
1/7/2009  Miguel Lopes — Rio Ave → Porto — €600,000
1/7/2009  Orlando Sá — Braga → Porto — Undisclosed
1/7/2009  Silvestre Varela — Estrela da Amadora → Porto — Free
1/7/2009  Ramires —  Cruzeiro → Benfica — €7.5 million
1/7/2009  Luis Aguiar — Braga →  Dynamo Moscow — €3 million
1/7/2009  Angelo Peña —  Estudiantes de Mérida → Braga — Undisclosed
1/7/2009  Peçanha —  Thrasyvoulos → Marítimo — Free
1/7/2009  Jonathan Bru —  AEP Paphos → Académica de Coimbra — Free
1/7/2009  David Mendieta —  12 de Octubre → Vitória de Guimarães — €150,000
1/7/2009  Alex —  Wolfsburg → Vitória de Guimarães — Free
1/7/2009  Kamani Hill —  Wolfsburg → Vitória de Guimarães — Free
1/7/2009  Maicon — Nacional → Porto — €1.1 million
1/7/2009  Álvaro Pereira —  CFR Cluj → Porto — €4.5 million
1/7/2009  Boris Peškovič — Académica de Coimbra →  CFR Cluj — Free
1/7/2009  Paulo Machado — Porto →  Toulouse — €3.5 million
1/7/2009  José Shaffer —  Racing Club → Benfica — €2 million
1/7/2009  Anselmo — Estrela da Amadora → Nacional — Free
1/7/2009  Marcelo Boeck — Marítimo → Varzim — Loan
1/7/2009  Nejc Pečnik —  NK Celje → Nacional — Undisclosed
1/7/2009  Jorge Gonçalves —  Racing de Santander → Vitória de Guimarães — Loan
1/7/2009  Paulo Jorge — Braga →  APOEL — Undisclosed
1/7/2009  Ruben Ribeiro — Leixões → Nacional — Undisclosed
1/7/2009  Manuel José —  CFR Cluj → Paços de Ferreira — Undisclosed
1/7/2009  José Marafona — Varzim → Marítimo — Undisclosed
1/7/2009  Nuno Piloto — Académica de Coimbra →  Iraklis Thessaloniki — Undisclosed
1/7/2009  Carlos Milhazes —  Timişoara → Vitória de Guimarães — €200,000
1/7/2009  Gustavo Lazzaretti —  Atlético PR → Vitória de Guimarães — Undisclosed
1/7/2009  Nenê — Nacional →  Cagliari — €4.5 million
1/7/2009  Igor Pita —  Nacional → Beira-Mar — Loan
1/7/2009  Jairo —  Figueirense → Nacional — Undisclosed
1/7/2009  Marco Airosa — Nacional →  Inter Luanda — Loan
1/7/2009  Gregory — Vitória de Guimarães →  Sporting de Gijón — Undisclosed
1/7/2009  Kostas Katsouranis — Benfica →  Panathinaikos — €2.5 million
1/7/2009  João Tomás — Boavista → Rio Ave — Free
1/7/2009  Javier Saviola —  Real Madrid → Benfica — €5 million
1/7/2009  Matías Fernández —  Villarreal → Sporting CP — €3.635 million
1/7/2009  Brayan Angulo — Leixões →  Deportivo La Coruña — Loan
1/7/2009  Ney — Estrela da Amadora → Braga — Free
1/7/2009  Fernando Alexandre — Estrela da Amadora → Braga — Free
1/7/2009  Beto — Leixões → Porto — €750,000
1/7/2009  Lucho González — Porto →  Marseille — €18 million
1/7/2009  Diogo Valente — Porto → Braga — Free
1/7/2009  Joabe —  Villa Nova → Braga — Undisclosed
1/7/2009  Castanheira — Braga →  APOEL — Free
1/7/2009  Bruno Amaro — Nacional → Académica de Coimbra — Loan
1/7/2009  Tarik Sektioui — Porto →  Ajman Club — Free
2/7/2009  Rodrigo Possebon —  Manchester United → Braga — Loan
4/7/2009  Stélvio — Braga → União de Leiria — Loan
5/7/2009  Kevin Amuneke —  Timişoara → Nacional — Free
6/7/2009  Lisandro López — Porto →  Lyon — €24 million
6/7/2009  Fernando Belluschi —  Olympiacos → Porto — €5 million
7/7/2009  Fellipe Cardoso — Olhanense →  Sapucaiense — Free
7/7/2009  Ladji Keita —  AEP → Vitória de Setúbal — Undisclosed Fee
7/7/2009  Ulick Lupede —  Rodez → Naval 1º de Maio — Free
8/7/2009  Diego Gaúcho — Gil Vicente → Olhanense — Free
8/7/2009  Cristián Trombetta —  Nueva Chicago → Leixões — Undisclosed
8/7/2009  Cauê —  Santo André → Leixões — Free
8/7/2009  Bruno Gama — Porto → Rio Ave — Free
8/7/2009  Chico Silva — Paços de Ferreira → Oliveirense — Free
8/7/2009  Kiko — Paços de Ferreira → Gil Vicente — Loan
8/7/2009  João Pedro — União de Leiria → Oliveirense — Free
9/7/2009  Filipe da Costa —  Levski Sofia → Nacional — Undisclosed
9/7/2009  Paulão — Naval 1º de Maio → Braga — Undisclosed
9/7/2009  Leandro Salino — Nacional →  Náutico — Free
10/7/2009  Miguel Rosa — Benfica → Oliveirense — Loan
10/7/2009  Wender — Braga →  Ermis Aradippou — Free
10/7/2009  Candeias — Porto →  Recreativo de Huelva — Loan
10/7/2009  Vieirinha — Porto →  PAOK — €350,000
11/7/2009  Wagnão — União de Leiria → Feirense — Free
11/7/2009  Przemysław Kaźmierczak — Porto → Vitória de Setúbal — Loan
11/7/2009  Vukašin Dević —  Red Star Belgrade → Belenenses — Free
13/7/2009  Joeano — Vitória de Setúbal →  Ermis Aradippou — Free
13/7/2009  João Fajardo — Vitória de Guimarães →  Panthrakikos — Free
14/7/2009  Saulo — Belenenses →  Celta de Vigo — Undisclosed
14/7/2009  Ibson — Porto →  Spartak Moscow — €5 million
14/7/2009  Vítor Vinha — Académica de Coimbra →  Nea Salamis Famagusta — Free
14/7/2009  Janício — Vitória de Setúbal →  Anorthosis Famagusta — Undisclosed
14/7/2009  Lovro Šćrbec — Nacional →  Varteks — Free
14/7/2009  Miguel Tininho — Belenenses →  Steaua București — Free
14/7/2009  Fernando Ávalos — Belenenses →  Nea Salamis — Free
15/7/2009  Vítor Castanheira — Braga → Chaves — Loan
15/7/2009  Hugo Santos — Naval 1º de Maio →  Hangzhou Greentown — Free
15/7/2009  Falcao —  River Plate → Porto — €3.93 million
15/7/2009  Maykon — Belenenses → Paços de Ferreira — Free
15/7/2009  Pedro Alves — Vitória de Setúbal → Pinhalnovense — Free
15/7/2009  Romeu Ribeiro — Benfica → Trofense — Loan
15/7/2009  Diego Valeri —  Lanús → Porto — €2.3 million (Loan for 2 years)
16/7/2009  Hélder Barbosa — Porto → Vitória de Setúbal — Loan
16/7/2009  Filipe Mendes — Estrelada Amadora → Paços de Ferreira — Free
17/7/2009  Jaime — Olhanense → Sertanense — Free
17/7/2009  Ruben Lima — Benfica → Vitória de Setúbal — Loan
17/7/2009  Diogo Viana — Porto →  VVV-Venlo — Loan
17/7/2009  Aldo —  Cruzeiro → Marítimo — Loan
17/7/2009  Ruca — Porto → Marítimo — Free
17/7/2009  Carlos Carneiro — Paços de Ferreira → Vizela — Free
17/7/2009  Leandro Lima — Porto →  Cruzeiro — Loan
18/7/2009  Robert Tucker —  Quilmes → Leixões — Free
19/7/2009  Aly Cissokho — Porto →  Lyon — €15 million
19/7/2009  Gonçalo — Académica de Coimbra → Santa Clara — Loan
19/7/2009  Juninho — Nacional →  Bahia — Undisclosed
19/7/2009  Kristian Pavlović — Nacional → Santana — Loan
20/7/2009  Pelé — Porto →  Real Valladolid — Loan
20/7/2009  Hammes —  Rio Branco → União de Leiria — Free
20/7/2009  Alberto —  Rio Branco → União de Leiria — Free
21/7/2009  Javi García —  Real Madrid → Benfica — €7 million
21/7/2009  Luiz Carlos — União de Leiria →  South China — Free
22/7/2009  Maciel — União Leiria → Gil Vicente — Loan
22/7/2009  Bruno Grassi — Marítimo → Tourizense — Loan
22/7/2009  Weldon —  Sport Recife → Benfica — €200,000
23/7/2009  Felipe Caicedo —  Manchester City → Sporting CP — Loan
25/8/2009  Adriano – FC Porto → } SC Braga – Free
28/8/2009  Felipe Menezes –  Goiás → Benfica – 1,500,000 €
28/8/2009  Mehdi Kerrouche –  GFCO Ajaccio → Naval 1º de Maio – Free
29/8/2009  Miguel Angulo –  Valencia → Sporting CP – Free
29/8/2009  Wênio – Vitória Guimarães → Leixões – Free
29/8/2009  Jorginho – SC Braga →  Gaziantepspor – Free
30/8/2009  Roland Linz – SC Braga →  Gaziantepspor – Undisclosed
30/8/2009  Ronaldo Maczinski – Rio Ave → Oliveirense – Free
30/8/2009  Milan Purović – Sporting CP →  Videoton – Loan
30/8/2009  El Hadji Diouf →  AEK Athens – Vitória Setúbal – Free
30/8/2009  Tiago Pinto – Sporting CP → SC Braga – Free
30/8/2009  Tiago Luís –  Santos → União Leiria – Free
31/8/2009  Patric – Benfica →  Cruzeiro – Loan

Winter 2009–10
1/1/2010  Neca –  Ankaraspor – Vitória Setúbal – Free
1/1/2010  Mexer –  GD Maputo → Sporting CP – 166,000 €
1/1/2010  João Pereira – SC Braga → Sporting CP – 3,000,000 €
1/1/2010  Florent Sinama Pongolle –  Atlético Madrid → Sporting CP – 6,500,000 €
1/1/2010  Vladimir Stojković – Sporting CP →  Wigan Athletic – Loan
1/1/2010  Edcarlos – Benfica →  Cruz Azul – Loan
1/1/2010  Airton –  Flamengo – Benfica – 2,500,000 €
1/1/2010  Alan Kardec –  Vasco Da Gama – Benfica – 2,600,000 €
1/1/2010  Éder Luís –  Atlético Mineiro – Benfica – 3,500,000 €
4/1/2010  László Sepsi – Benfica → Timişoara – 1,500,000 €
5/1/2010  Jonathan Urretavizcaya – Benfica –  Peñarol – Loan
6/1/2010  Freddy Adu – Benfica –  Aris – Loan
8/1/2010  Wason Rentería – FC Porto → SC Braga – Loan
15/1/2010  Luis Aguiar –  Dynamo Moscow → SC Braga – Loan
30/1/2010  Pedro Mendes –  Glasgow Rangers → Sporting CP – 1,300,000 €
 1/2/2010  Abdelmalek Cherrad –  - SC Bastia → C.S. Marítimo – Free

Liga